The 2022 Fort Valley State Wildcats men's volleyball team, the first ever Fort Valley State men's volleyball team, represents Fort Valley State University in the 2022 NCAA Division I & II men's volleyball season. The Wildcats, led by first year head coach Larry Wrather, play their home games at HPE Arena. The Wildcats compete as members of the Southern Intercollegiate Athletic Conference.

Season highlights
Will be filled in as the season progresses.

Roster

Schedule
TV/Internet Streaming information:
All home games will be streamed on Team 1 Sports. Most road games will also be streamed by the schools streaming service.

 *-Indicates conference match.
 Times listed are Eastern Time Zone.

Announcers for televised games
King: Brittany Ramsey & Julie Ward
Benedict: No commentary
Belmont Abbey: No commentary
Reinhardt: No commentary
Charleston: Jack Withrow & Mychal Schulz
Charleston: Mychal Schulz
Tusculum: Jim Miller  
Maryville: No commentary
Emmanuel: Logan Reese & Taylor Roberts
Morehouse: No commentary
Edward Waters: No commentary
Central State: Doug Brown
Edward Waters: No commentary
Morehouse: No commentary
Edward Waters: No commentary
Kentucky State: No commentary
Benedict: No commentary

References

2022 in sports in Georgia (U.S. state)
Fort Valley State
2022 Southern Intercollegiate Athletic Conference men's volleyball season